Daniel B. Smith (July 14, 1792 – March, 1883) was an educator, pharmacist, and taxidermist in Philadelphia, Pennsylvania.

Biography
Smith was educated at the Burlington Friends School under John Griscom, where he acquired an interest in scientific studies. In January 1811, he dissected and mounted a Bald Eagle (Haliaeetus leucocephalus) that was collected by Alexander Wilson (1766–1813) near Egg Harbor Township, New Jersey, which became the model for Wilson's drawing, which was engraved by Alexander Lawson (1773–1846) for Pl. 36 of American Ornithology, vol. 4 (1811). Wilson also quoted at length from Smith's dissection notes, and his original sketch of Smith's taxidermy is preserved in the archives of the Ernst Mayr Library, Museum of Comparative Zoology, Harvard University.

On graduating, he apprenticed to John Biddle in the apothecary business, 
and on completion he was admitted to partnership. In 1819 he opened a drug store in
downtown Philadelphia, and in 1828 he entered into partnership with William Hodgson, renaming the 
firm "Smith & Hodgson", and continued to be active in business until a few years before his death. 
At the age of 28, he was one of the founders of the Apprentices' Library of Philadelphia.

Smith was a prominent member of a group of pharmacists that in 1821 established the Philadelphia College of Pharmacy (now the University of the Sciences in Philadelphia) the first college of pharmacy in the country, was elected vice president in 1828, and from 1829 to 1854 served as president. In 1852, he became the first president of the American Pharmaceutical Association.

In 1824, Smith married Esther Morton, daughter of John Morton, a prominent Philadelphia merchant
and banker, and his second wife, Mary Robinson of Newport, RI. They had sons John and Benjamin, 
and one daughter, Mary.

 Smith was chairman of the committee that in 1826 published the first issue of the "American Journal of Pharmacy." He was acclaimed for his wide knowledge of the natural sciences and liberal arts, and in 1834 became Professor of Moral Philosophy, English Literature, and Chemistry in Haverford School (now Haverford College), and served as Superintendent (Principal) from 1843-1846.

With his background in moral teaching he was prominent in starting the House of Refuge for 
Juvenile Delinquents in 1828. He was an important organizer of the American Pharmaceutical Association in 1852, and convened its first meeting in Philadelphia, where he was elected the APhA's first president.

Smith was an original member of the Franklin Institute, and also of the Pennsylvania Historical Society from its organization in 1825, and was its first corresponding secretary. Throughout his life he was active in the Society of Friends (Quakers) and served a term as clerk (convenor) of the Philadelphia Quarterly Meeting. He was also a member of the American Philosophical Society and of the Academy of Natural Sciences in Philadelphia. 

He was an original incorporator of the "Old Philadelphia Saving Fund". 
He published "The Principles of Chemistry" (Philadelphia, 1837,1842). Daniel Smith's 
son Benjamin R. Smith married Esther Fisher Wharton, the sister of Joseph Wharton. The
American Pharmacists Association continues a yearly award in the name of Daniel B. Smith
for excellence in the practice of Pharmacy.

Footnotes

References 
 Chapter on Daniel B. Smith in: "Quaker biographies, series II : brief biographical sketches concerning certain members of the Religious Society of Friends". Philadelphia : PYM book store, 1926.
 History of the Apprentices' Library of Philadelphia, 1820-1920: The Oldest Free Circulating Library in America, by John Frederick Lewis (Philadelphia, 1924). http://www.coe.missouri.edu/~seaveyca/1876/Apprentice.html
 George D. Feidt Company Records, 1833-1939, Historical Collections of the College of Physicians of Philadelphia: https://web.archive.org/web/20070213211301/http://www.collphyphil.org/FIND_AID/hist/histgdf1.htm
 History of Haverford College, Chapters 2 & 5:
https://web.archive.org/web/20070119180456/http://www.haverford.edu/library/collegehistory/pdfs/chapters/HistoryInterpretation_Chapter2.pdf
https://web.archive.org/web/20070119180521/http://www.haverford.edu/library/collegehistory/pdfs/chapters/HistoryInterpretation_Chapter5.pdf

 Minutes of Quarterly Meeting of Friends held in Philadelphia, the Sixth of the Fifth Month, 1850: Haverford College Library.
 Daniel B. Smith papers, 1834-1845, Haverford College Library.
 Daniel B. Smith records, 1826-1851, Pennsylvania Historical Society.
 Family tree of Daniel B Smith: http://wharton.freeservers.com/danielburlingtonsmith.html
 New England Women and Their Families in the 18th and 19th Centuries:
http://www.lexisnexis.com/documents/academic/upa_cis/2628_NEWomenSerBPt1.pdf

 Williams-Miles Collection—Rare Chemistry: https://web.archive.org/web/20060903070109/http://quest.harding.edu/A_CHEM1.pdf
 American Pharmacists Association—Awards Application and Guidebook, 2005
https://web.archive.org/web/20070821210537/http://www.aphanet.org/AM/Template.cfm?Section=Home

 The Principles of Chemistry: Prepared for the use of schools, academies, and colleges,  by Daniel B Smith. 1842
https://books.google.com/books?id=aSMJAAAAIAAJ&printsec=frontcover&dq=daniel+b+smith&hl=en&sa=X&ei=BNY5T4W_D-Pz0gH3v7HKCw&ved=0CEcQ6AEwAg#v=onepage&q=daniel%20b%20smith&f=false 
Reprinted by Nabu Press (February 8, 2010) 

1792 births
1883 deaths
American Quakers
American pharmacists
Educators from Philadelphia
Heads of universities and colleges in the United States
University of the Sciences
19th-century American educators